Gary Meir Mordechai Assous (born 4 March 1988) is a French-Israeli professional footballer. He is currently contracted with Hapoel Katamon Jerusalem.

Biography 
Gary grew up in France in a Jewish family along with his brother Jonathan. Gary originally was part of the youth system of Paris Saint-Germain before he sustained a major injury. He continued through the youth ranks of AC Ajaccio before moving down to then Championnat club, AS Cannes.

Arrival to Israel
Assous arrived in Israel after his brother spent a season with Maccabi Tel Aviv and joined the Maccabi Netanya youth team for a trial. After impressing during a training match between the youth and full teams, Assous was signed by Netanya to a three-year contract starting at $40,000 a year. Within a short time of Lothar Matthäus's arrival to Maccabi Netanya, he decided to release Assous from his contract without even seeing Assous in training.

After being released by Netanya, Assous trialled with Maccabi Ahi Nazareth.

Statistics

See also
List of select Jewish football (association; soccer) players

Footnotes

External links 
 

1988 births
Living people
21st-century French Jews
French footballers
Israeli footballers
Jewish French sportspeople
Maccabi Netanya F.C. players
Maccabi Herzliya F.C. players
Hapoel Jerusalem F.C. players
Maccabi Be'er Sheva F.C. players
Hapoel Katamon Jerusalem F.C. players
Maccabi Ironi Bat Yam F.C. players
Israeli Premier League players
Liga Leumit players
French emigrants to Israel
Association football midfielders